is a Japanese politician of the Democratic Party of Japan, a member of the House of Representatives in the Diet (national legislature). A native of Kurashiki, Okayama and graduate of Okayama University, he worked at the publisher Yurindo from 1997 to 2002. He was elected to the House of Representatives for the first time in 2005 after an unsuccessful run in 2003.

References

External links
 Official website in Japanese.

Living people
1972 births
Democratic Party of Japan politicians
Members of the House of Representatives (Japan)
21st-century Japanese politicians